The 2009 Polish Speedway season was the 2009 season of motorcycle speedway in Poland.

Individual

Polish Individual Speedway Championship

Golden Helmet

Junior Championship

Silver Helmet
 winner - Grzegorz Zengota

Bronze Helmet
 winner - Maciej Janowski

Pairs

Polish Pairs Speedway Championship

Team

Team Speedway Polish Championship
The 2009 Team Speedway Polish Championship was the 2009 edition of the Team Polish Championship. ZKŻ Zielona Góra won the gold medal.

Ekstraliga
The 2009 Ekstraliga (known as the CenterNet Mobile Speedway Ekstraliga for sponsorship reasons) was the 10th Ekstraliga season.Playoffs1.Liga
The 2009 First League was the second division of the Team Speedway Polish Championship.Playoffs2.Liga
The 2009 Second League was the third division of the Team Speedway Polish Championship.Playoffs'''

References

Poland Individual
Poland Team
Speedway
2009 in Polish speedway